"Everybody" is a dance single by Russian DJ Leonid Rudenko. The song features vocals from Kelly Barnes, a Los Angeles singer from the band Ragsy. The unofficial remix shown on UK music stations, such as Kiss, samples the song "Cop That Shit", by Timbaland & Magoo featuring Missy Elliott. Charleene Rená starred in the music video.

Chart performance 

On its first week of release, the song peaked at a position of number 24 in the UK Singles Chart and number 2 in the UK Dance Chart, but it only appeared in the Top 75 Singles Chart for 3 weeks. Despite an average chart position, the video proved very popular amongst music stations such as 4Music, where it rose to number 4 on its 'Today's 4Music Top 10' chart and was rotated heavily on music stations such as The Box, MTV Dance, Flaunt and Clubland TV.

Track listing

EU CD maxi single
"Everybody" (Radio Mix) — 2:44
"Everybody" (Club Mix) — 5:53
"Everybody" (Dabruck & Klein Remix) — 7:09
"Everybody" (Bass Slammers Remix) — 5:44

UK CD 1 
"Everybody" (Radio Edit) — 2:44
"Everybody" (Morjac Edit) — 6:27

UK CD 2 
"Everybody" (Club Mix) — 5:59
"Everybody" (Darbuck & Klein Remix) — 7:10
"Everybody" (Morjac Remix) — 6:27
"Everybody" (Danny Byrd Remix) — 6:06

UK Maxi CD 
"Everybody" (Radio Edit) — 2:50
"Everybody" (Club Mix) — 5:59
"Everybody" (Don Diablo Remix) — 6:03
"Everybody" (Morjac Remix) — 6:27
"Everybody" (Darbuck & Klein Remix) — 7:10
"Everybody" (Agent X Remix) — 4:21
"Everybody" (Danny Byrd Remix) — 6:06

Official mixes
"Everybody" (Radio Edit) — 02:50
"Everybody" (Extended/Club Mix) — 05:59
"Everybody" (Morjac Mix) — 06:27
"Everybody" (Darbuck & Klein Remix) — 07:10
"Everybody" (Nino Anthony's Confessions Mix) — 07:15
"Everybody" (Don Diablo Remix) — 06:03
"Everybody" (Disko Loko Mix) — 08:02
"Everybody" (123xyz Mix) — 07:35
"Everybody" (Agent X Remix) — 04:21
"Everybody" (Danny Byrd Remix) — 6:06

Charts

Weekly charts

Year-end charts

References

2009 singles
2008 songs
Songs written by Alexander Perls